TVE 50 Años was a Spanish free-to-air television channel owned and operated by Televisión Española (TVE), the television division of state-owned public broadcaster Radiotelevisión Española (RTVE). It was created to commemorate the fiftieth anniversary of Televisión Española and was known for broadcasting classic programmes from its historical audiovisual archive.

It was launched on 30 November 2005 time-sharing schedule with Clan. They replaced Canal Nostalgia that was discontinued several months before. TVE 50 Años was discontinued on 1 January 2007 and Clan expanded broadcast to a 24-hour schedule.

Ratings
 
 Share
0,45 (May 2001)
0,48 (January 2002)
0,47 (February 2002)
0,49 (2003)
0,47 (2004)
0,57 (2005)
0,54 (2006)
0,59 (End)
0,50 (January 2007)

External links
 Official Site 
 TVE 50 Años Program Schedule

Television channels and stations established in 2005
2005 establishments in Spain
Television channels and stations disestablished in 2007
2007 disestablishments in Spain
RTVE defunct channels
Defunct television channels in Spain
Classic television networks